Violet is the second studio album by The Birthday Massacre, released on August 9, 2005. It was first released as an extended play (EP) on October 25, 2004, then commercially released on August 9, 2005 as a long play (LP) through Metropolis Records (North America/UK), Repo Records  (Europe) and Hellion Records (Brazil). The LP version included four re-recorded and slightly reworked tracks from their Nothing and Nowhere album: "Happy Birthday", "Horror Show", "Video Kid" and "The Dream".

Track listing

Personnel
Credits adapted from Violet album liner notes.
Chibi - vocals
Rainbow - rhythm guitar
M. Falcore - lead guitar
Aslan - bass
Rhim - drums

Release history

Notes
The LP version was originally released in Europe on Repo Records in 2004.
Tracks "Happy Birthday", "Horror Show", "Video Kid" and "The Dream" are all somewhat reworked versions of their equivalents on the band's previous album Nothing and Nowhere.
Videos for both "Blue" and "Nevermind" were produced. "Blue" is an elaborate story-based video while "Nevermind" is a straightforward performance video, both of which were released on the "Blue DVD".
Although the track list on the CD labels the final track as "Nevermind", if burned on iTunes, the track will be titled "Neverland".
The band recorded a cover of The NeverEnding Story theme for the album, but left it off after not being pleased with the final result. The only existing version of the song is a low quality mp3 that can be found on P2P file sharing systems, or on their original EP under the name Imagica. However, on March 19, 2021, they released a newly recorded version as a single.
On the 2004 release of Violet, Adm is pictured in the booklet as the keyboardist. On the 2005 re-release, he is removed from the booklet picture because he had left the band by that time.
 The track "Happy Birthday" was featured in the eighth episode of the first season of The Vampire Diaries, "162 Candles.",

References

2004 albums
The Birthday Massacre albums
Metropolis Records albums